Bruce Mackinnon (born 17 October 1978) is an English actor and writer who has appeared in various television programmes and films.

Mackinnon was born in Esher, Surrey and was educated at Eton College, before studying drama at The University of Manchester. He began his career in the comedy duo "Mat and Mackinnon" with Mathew Horne. MacKinnon has starred in TV shows such as The Office, The Catherine Tate Show, Smack the Pony and for HBO Rome. Movie credits include Life and Death of Peter Sellers, The Duchess and Vanity Fair. He has also written for television shows such as The Catherine Tate Show, Alistair MacGowan, Johnny Vaughan and for Dara Ó Briain on Live Floor Show. In 2012, Mackinnon was selected to play Sir Andrew Aguecheek in the RSC's 2012 production of Twelfth Night, directed by David Farr. In 2014 Mackinnon has appeared in Inside No. 9 for the BBC.  Utopia for Channel 4 and the Marvel Studios movie Guardians of the Galaxy.

In 2015 MacKinnon starred in Showtime / Hat Trick Productions Episodes. In 2022 he appeared as Isaac in Ghosts.

Partial filmography

The Office (2002, TV Series) - Jimmy the Perv
Trevor's World of Sport (2003, TV Series) - Marcus
My Hero (2003, TV Series)
Absolute Power (2003, TV Series) - Line Up Reception
The Life and Death of Peter Sellers (2004) - Reporter #1 - Britt at Hospital
Vanity Fair (2004) - Casino Boy
Fat Slags (2004) - Minion 1
Agatha Christie's Marple (2004, TV Series) - Scamper
The Catherine Tate Show (2004–2005, TV Series) - Tony, Man on Train
Things to Do Before You're 30 (2005) - Colin
Rome (2005, TV Series) - Priscus Maevius
Home Again (2006, TV Series) - Mark
Jekyll (2007, TV Mini-Series) - Malcolm
The Duchess (2008) - Sir Peter Teazle
Lewis (2008) - Conan Jones
Taking the Flak (2009, TV Series) - Harry Chambers
Big Top (2009, TV Series) - Boyco
M.I. High (2010) - The Octopus
Freddy Frogface (2011) - (voice)
Tad, The Lost Explorer (2012) - The Mummy (voice)
All at Sea (2013, TV Series) - Mr. Atkinson
United Passions (2014) - Louis Muhlinghaus
Guardians of the Galaxy (2014) - Vorker, One-Eyed Ravager
The Bad Education Movie (2015) - Grant Dodd (Security Guard)
Lovesick (2016, TV Series) - Hotel Manager
The Mercy (2018) - Barman
Bohemian Rhapsody (2018) - Reporter 2
Kill Ben Lyk (2018) - Banker Ben Lyk
Final Fantasy XIV: Shadowbringers (2019, Video Game) - Chai-Nuzz / Tolshs Aath (voice)

External links

References 

1978 births
English male television actors
English people of Scottish descent
Living people
People educated at Eton College
People from Esher